Ismail Hoxha is a member of the Assembly of the Republic of Albania for the Democratic Party of Albania.

References

Living people
Democratic Party of Albania politicians
Members of the Parliament of Albania
21st-century Albanian politicians
Year of birth missing (living people)